The 1982 Giro del Trentino was the sixth edition of the Tour of the Alps cycle race and was held on 4 May to 6 May 1982. The race started in Arco and finished in Trento. The race was won by Giuseppe Saronni.

General classification

References

1982
May 1982 sports events in Europe
1982 in road cycling
1982 in Italian sport